East Main Street–Douglass Heights Historic District is a national historic district located at Union, Union County, South Carolina.  The district encompasses 55 contributing buildings in a primarily residential section of Union.  The houses were built between about 1823 to 1940, and are in a variety of popular architectural styles include Neo-Classical, Queen Anne, and Colonial Revival. Notable dwellings include the Steadman-Nicholson House, Laurens G. Young House, and William H. Wallace House.  Located in the district is the separately listed Union High School-Main Street Grammar School.

It was added to the National Register of Historic Places in 1989.

References

Houses on the National Register of Historic Places in South Carolina
Historic districts on the National Register of Historic Places in South Carolina
Queen Anne architecture in South Carolina
Colonial Revival architecture in South Carolina
Neoclassical architecture in South Carolina
Houses in Union County, South Carolina
National Register of Historic Places in Union County, South Carolina